Oaklands Catholic School/Academy is a Roman Catholic co-educational secondary school and sixth form college with academy status located in Waterlooville, Hampshire, United Kingdom. It opened in 1966, although its history can be traced back to 1902. Around 1400 students attend the school with over 150 in the Sixth Form.

Oaklands has been a Specialist Humanities College since September 2005.

Buildings
The school consists of seven different blocks, mainly separated into different subject groups. There have been an extensive site improvement programme seeing the replacement of prefabricated buildings with purpose designed brick-built buildings. The three new blocks consist of a new music block, Humanities block (Formerly C block, now John Paul II block) and Sixth Form Block. Each of these blocks has been built in a similar style, often incorporating a cross in different coloured bricks.  2012 has seen a major refurbishment of the Maths/Science block with Maths moving to A Block and the labs being update in three phases with completion eventually around Summer 2013.

The grounds incorporate many mature oak trees, giving the site its name.

The White House, which houses admin and religious education, is a Palladian structure built for General Napier.

Ofsted
The school received a 'Good' Ofsted report in 2017, however were accredited, with 'many outstanding features'.

Section 48
The school received an 'outstanding' section 48 report in 2019. (Inspection of Religious education aspects.)

Subjects
The Religious Education (RE) department offers a GCSE course that is compulsory for all students; the course is an AQA course and students learn about two religions, Catholic Christianity and Judaism. They also study themes. An A level course is also available for sixth form students, educating about the new testament, and the 'themes' on the course at the time.

The maths department located in the upper floors of Thomas More block, offering GCSE and A level courses. The maths department uses e-education resources such as MathsWatch and MathsBuster for student homework tasks. Students can choose their exam board for this subject.

The music department offers GCSE and A level music and instrument tuition. There are currently three school bands, the Oaklands band, the Concert band, and the Big band. For GCSE the exam board is AQA.

The Geography department is situated in the top of new John Paul II block. The team teach for GCSE and A level.

The technology department located in  Angelico block accommodates Art, Electronics, textiles, metal work, photography and resistant materials. The food preparation technology is located in the 2 new kitchens on John Henry Newman block. A GCSE course is available in all technology subjects. A level courses are available but only in fine art and design.

Alumni
Alumni of Oaklands School include:
 Louise Casey, Baroness Casey of Blackstock attended Oaklands between 1976 and 1983
 Jon Cruddas, elected in 2010 as the Labour MP for Dagenham and Rainham, having been elected in 2001 for the preceding Dagenham constituency.
 Caroline Dinenage, elected in 2010 as the Conservative MP for Gosport
 Penny Mordaunt, elected in 2010 as the Conservative MP for Portsmouth North and former Secretary of State for Defence.
 James Ward-Prowse, Southampton F.C. team captain and England national football team player

Uniform
The school uniform was redesigned for the September 2009 academic year; the expense of the uniform caused controversy. A press release was released on the school website claiming many of the facts written by the newspaper articles were incorrect, and that the uniform was very hard wearing due to its materials. As a response to the controversy, the school started a nearly new uniform shop where the uniform could be brought cheaper.

References

External links
School history

1966 establishments in England
Academies in Hampshire
Catholic secondary schools in the Diocese of Portsmouth
Secondary schools in Hampshire